The Fifth of July is the seventh album by the Power pop band Watershed. The songs on the album have been featured on MTV's Date My Mom, Made, and Laguna Beach. In addition, they've been in rotations from South Carolina to Seattle. This album was also the first to feature Mark "Poochie" Borror. Watershed is managed by Thomas O'Keefe, a longtime fan of the band.

Track list
 "Obvious" – 2:51
 "The Habit" – 1:50
 "5th of July" – 2:51
 "Slowly Then Suddenly" – 3:16
 "Small Doses" – 3:02
 "Getting Ready" – 3:22
 "Laundromat" – 2:54
 "My Lucky Day" – 2:47
 "New Depression" – 3:01
 "Going Through the Motions" – 3:46
 "The Best Is Yet to Come" – 2:28

Credits
Colin Gawel – vocals, guitar
Joe Oestreich – Vocals, bass guitar
Dave Masica – drums
Mark "Poochie" Borror – guitar

Watershed (American band) albums
2005 albums